The Arboretum du Puy Chabrol (38 hectares) is an arboretum located near the community of Barsanges, northwest of Meymac, Corrèze, Limousin, France. The arboretum was created between World War I and World War II by Marius Vazeilles (1881-1973), a naturalist and forestry expert. It contains approximately 400 exotic species.

See also 
 List of botanical gardens in France

References 
 Marius Vazeilles, Le Plateau de Millevaches: Historique de sa mise en valeur, Conférence faite à la cérémonie de remise des insignes d'Officier de la Légion d'Honneur le 29 mars 1958. Eyboulet, Ussel, 17 pages, 1958. Contains a two-page map of the Arboretum du Puy Chabrol.
 Gilbert Pons, Le paysage: sauvegarde et création, Editions Champ Vallon, 1999, page 99. .
 Revue historique de l'armée; revue trimestrielle de l'état-major de l'armée, service historique, France Armée, Ministère de la guerre (France), 1945, page 162.
 Comptes rendus des séances de l'Académie d'agriculture de France, Académie d'agriculture de France, 1949, page 104.
 Comptes rendus des séances de l'Académie d'agriculture de France, Académie d'agriculture de France, 1973, page 987.
 Marius Vazeilles
 Mémoire Ouvrière en Limousin | Marius Vazeilles
 Arbres Remarquables (French)

Puy Chabrol, Arboretum du
Puy Chabrol, Arboretum du